Shaun Christopher O'Shea Rogers (born March 12, 1979) is a former American football defensive tackle. He played college football for the University of Texas.  He was drafted by the Detroit Lions in the 2nd round (61st overall) of the 2001 NFL Draft.  Rogers has also played for the Cleveland Browns and New Orleans Saints of the National Football League (NFL).  Running back Adrian Peterson considered Rogers one of the hardest-hitting players in the NFL.

Early years
At La Porte High School in La Porte, Texas, Rogers was a two-way tackle, and also lettered in basketball. He is known for his athleticism, ability to rush the quarterback, and also his ability to stop the run.  He was also known to play running back near the goal line. He had 17 attempts for 135 yards. His nickname in the locker room was Chunks.

College career
Shaun Rogers played for the University of Texas, pairing with nose tackle Casey Hampton, and ranked third on the school's career-record list with 53 stops behind the line of scrimmage. He collected 199 tackles (108 solo) with 14 sacks and 54 pressures during his career. In 2000, he was named to the AP Honorable Mention All-Big 12 Team. That year, he played in nine games, starting six contests at right defensive tackle. He helped the Longhorns lead the nation in pass efficiency defense and rank seventh in total defense. He recorded 44 tackles (24 solos) with 3.5 sacks for minus 31 yards and 27 stops for losses of 56 yards.

Professional career

2001 NFL Draft
Prior to the draft, Rogers recorded a 5.3 sec 40-yard dash while weighing . Rogers was selected by the Detroit Lions in the second round (61st overall) in the 2001 NFL Draft.

Detroit Lions
In his rookie season, he recorded 90 tackles (68 solo), 3 sacks, 1 forced fumble, and 4 pass deflections in 16 starts.  In 2002, Rogers finished with 48 tackles (26 solo), 2.5 sacks, and 2 pass deflections in 14 games.  In 2003, he started in all 16 games and finished the season with 58 tackles (42 solo), 4 sacks, 1 forced fumble, and 5 pass deflections. His 2004 season was nearly identical to the previous one, as he again started in all 16 games and posted 68 tackles (48 solo), 4 sacks, and 5 pass deflections. He was selected as a Pro Bowl starter and was named an AP 2nd Team All-Pro.  In 2005, Rogers recorded 39 tackles (29 solo), 5.5 sacks, 2 forced fumbles, and 2 pass deflections in 14 games and was selected as a Pro Bowl starter for the second straight year.

On October 18, 2006, Rogers was suspended four games for violating the NFL's substance abuse policy. His agent has stated that Rogers' appetite suppressant medication was the reason for his positive test, but that appealing would not help the situation.  Rogers played in only 6 games during the 2006 season and finished with 20 tackles (19 solo) and 3 sacks.

On November 4, 2007, Rogers intercepted a pass from Denver Broncos quarterback Patrick Ramsey and returned it 66 yards for a touchdown.  Rogers recorded 39 tackles (26 solo), 7 sacks, 1 interception, and 3 pass deflection in 16 games during the 2007 season.

Cleveland Browns
On February 29, 2008, Rogers was traded to the Cleveland Browns in exchange for Leigh Bodden and 2008 3rd round pick Andre Fluellen.  The Browns ran a 3-4 defense, as opposed to the 4-3 defense Rogers played in for Detroit, and Rogers became the Browns' 3-4 nose tackle.  In 2008, Rogers finished with 76 tackles (61 solo), 4.5 sacks, and 4 pass deflections in 16 games and was selected as a Pro Bowl reserve.  On November 30, 2009, Rogers was placed on Injured Reserve due to a broken leg.  He finished the 2009 season with 36 tackles (27 solo), 2 sacks, and 1 pass deflection.  During the 2010 offseason, Rogers was involved in trade rumors, but the Browns ultimately decided to keep him and move him to 3-4 defensive end, which was believed to better suit his skills than the nose tackle position. On February 9, 2011, Rogers was released by the Browns.

New Orleans Saints
On March 1, 2011, the Saints signed Rogers to a one-year contract worth $4 million. It has been reported that he was offered $6 million to play elsewhere, but ultimately decided to play for the Saints.  After a disappointing 2011 campaign, the Saints elected to not resign Rogers.

New York Giants
On April 26, 2012, the New York Giants signed Rogers to a contract. Due to a blood clot in his left calf, the team announced that Rogers would miss the entirety of the 2012-13 NFL season. However, after receiving a more encouraging second opinion on the injury, Giants coach Tom Coughlin maintained a "ray of hope" that Rogers could return before the season's end.

On August 31, 2012, Rogers was placed on season-ending injured reserve due to the clot. Then, the Giants re-signed Rogers on February 7, 2013.

NFL career statistics

Personal life
In June 2007, Rogers was accused of sexually assaulting an exotic dancer. Charges were never filed due to lack of evidence.

On April 1, 2010, Rogers was arrested at Cleveland Hopkins Airport for having a loaded gun in his carry on luggage.

References

External links
University Texas Longhorns Football bio
New York Giants bio
Detroit Lions bio
Cleveland Browns bio
New Orleans Saints bio

1979 births
Living people
Players of American football from Houston
La Porte High School (Texas) alumni
American football defensive tackles
American sportspeople in doping cases
Doping cases in American football
Texas Longhorns football players
Detroit Lions players
Cleveland Browns players
New Orleans Saints players
New York Giants players
National Conference Pro Bowl players